Davis Brody Bond is an American architectural firm headquartered in New York City, New York, with additional offices in Washington, DC and São Paulo, Brazil. The firm is named for Lewis Davis, Samuel Brody, and J. Max Bond Jr. and is led by five partners: Steven M. Davis, William H. Paxson, Carl F. Krebs, Christopher K. Grabé, and David K. Williams.

The work of the firm includes architectural and urban design projects for major universities, national, state and local governments, and other forms of public, private and institutional clients in the sectors of housing, museums, health care, and education. Notable projects include the National September 11 Memorial & Museum, the Portico Gallery at the Frick Collection, and the National Museum of African American History and Culture.

History
The firm was founded by Sam Brody, Lew Davis, and Chester Wisniewski in 1952 in New York. Davis, Brody and Wisniewski (now Davis Brody Bond) gained recognition by realizing social housing projects for New York City, such as Waterside Plaza. While the firm has expanded far beyond its original boundaries, the legacy of quality New York City work to the benefit of New Yorkers is still a keystone of the firm's design philosophy. After J. Max Bond Jr. joined the partnership in 1990, the firm became Davis Brody Bond in 1996. From 2006 to 2011 Davis Brody Bond was in partnership with Aedas. In 2010, Davis Brody Bond took an ownership interest in the architectural and interiors firm Spacesmith, a certified Women's Business Enterprise; the firms are housed together within the same office in New York.

Awards
Davis Brody Bond has been honored with more than 175 design awards including:

Presidential Award for Design Excellence
Architecture Firm Award, the highest honor given to an architectural practice by the American Institute of Architects
Urban Land Institute Award for Excellence
Thomas Jefferson Award for Public Architecture

Notable projects

National September 11 Memorial & Museum
Frick Collection addition of the Portico Gallery 
National Mall Union Square redesign
Manhattanville phase I + II implementation of Columbia University's new campus
New York Public Library Main Branch Major renovations and addition of the South Court
Audubon Ballroom Historic preservation and addition
District of Columbia Public Library Benning Library, Shaw Library

References

External links

Davis Brody Bond official web site
National Mall Design Competition: Gustafson Guthrie Nichol + Davis Brody Bond for Union Square
National September 11 Memorial & Museum
National Museum of African American History and Culture Museum Building Construction

Architecture firms based in New York City
Companies based in Manhattan
Design companies established in 1952
1952 establishments in New York City